Rayman Raving Rabbids is a 2006 platform video game published and developed by Ubisoft for the Game Boy Advance and Nintendo DS handheld video game consoles. It was also released on the Wii, PlayStation 2, and Xbox 360 video game consoles, as well as the PC. Unlike these versions which focus on mini-games, the handheld versions are more similar to traditional Rayman platformers.

Characters

Rayman:
Rayman is the main character in this game and Ubisoft's mascot. He has been captured by the insane bunnies and must take part in all the Rabbids' challenges so they are entertained. Eventually he collects 100 trophies and gets to fight the Rabbids' ultimate commander: the Rabble Droid.

The Rabbids are the antagonists of the game and have captured Rayman. They have put him in a gladiator-styled arena where he must take part in all their challenges in order to face up to the Rabble Droid. They are completely insane and would do anything to stop Rayman.

Game Boy Advance
Rayman Raving Rabbids for the Game Boy Advance is a platforming video game, unlike the console versions which are trial-based. It features characters and elements from previous Rayman games which are not present in the console versions of Raving Rabbids.

Gameplay
The gameplay is similar to the original Rayman side-scrolling game, however Rayman loses his 'adventurous' music. The game also uses the concept of the cancelled Rayman 4 prototype.

Plot
The game begins with Rayman taking a nap, only to be captured by insane Rabbids who lock him up in a cell. When Rayman comes to his senses, he notices his hands are missing. With the help from his friend Murfy, he retrieves his hands, rescues Globox and the Teensies, defeats a large, mechanical version of a Darktoon (an enemy from the first Rayman game) created by an intelligent Rabbid named Pink, and escapes the prison.

Soon, Rayman's fairy friend Ly appears and tells him about the Rabbids. According to her, they used to be a peaceful race of creatures who lived happily in the Glade of Dreams. Their kind and docile nature led the other creatures to make fun of them, take advantage of them, and always give them a hard time. Resentful and suffering, the rabbids then fled underground, and have only now resurfaced to have their revenge against everyone. Rayman is the world's only hope to stop them.

Nintendo DS
Rayman Raving Rabbids is a platform and party video game for the Nintendo DS. It was released on March 6, 2007.  The game is not only a platform like the Game Boy Advance version but also a party game like the console versions.

Gameplay
This game has five worlds: Beach, Forest, Jungle, Factory and Ice. The Beach world is more of a tutorial, and the Ice world only has two levels, each one a boss level. Nearly all the levels are set out like this: Get through the platforming part, beat the minigame and finally the ultimate challenge test. The platforming parts are like most other Rayman games, where you have to follow the path, beating enemies and collecting items.

The final challenge of each level is usually a game where Rayman is running forward of his own accord. Using your costumes of Earth, Fire, Ice and Wind, you must interact with obstacles to help Rayman get through alive and escape from the bunnies spaceship that is chasing him. On your way, you must collect all the trophies of that level in one go. There are 100 trophies in the entire game.

Also, there are three Ray Gear challenges in which you must avoid enemies fire and destroy the giant Fish Creature. These are timed, as if you are on the challenge for too long, a timer will start counting down to how long you have left.

Plot
While sitting underneath an apple tree in the forest one day, Rayman is captured by The Rabbids. They have decided to invade our world, and now Rayman is their toy, a prisoner gladiator to entertain them.

Rayman's only chance at freedom is to face the Rabble Droid, but to do that, he must win enough trophies and fight other champions. The version's plot is based on the console versions.

Reception

The reception of the Nintendo DS version was mixed. GameSpot gave the DS version a 5.9/10 and commented that the game had unsightly graphics and it was too short. IGN gave the DS version a 6.5/10, and wondered why Rayman Raving Rabbids played so well, but looked so awful.

References

External links

 Rayman Raving Rabbids (Game Boy Advance) at MobyGames
 Rayman Raving Rabbids (Nintendo DS) at MobyGames

2006 video games
Party video games
Rayman
Rabbids
Ubisoft games
Nintendo DS games
Game Boy Advance games
Video games about rabbits and hares
Video games developed in France
Video games developed in Morocco
Video games scored by Rod Abernethy